Mohatla Alfred Tseki (born 24 December 1964) is a South African politician who has served as a Member of the National Assembly of South Africa since 2019. Prior to his election to parliament, Tseki served as a Member of the Gauteng Provincial Legislature from 2014 to 2019. He is a member of the African National Congress.

Political career
Tseki was ranked 33rd on the ANC' list of candidates for the Gauteng Provincial Legislature in the 2014 election. He was elected to the provincial legislature as the ANC won 40 seats. Tseki served as chair of the Cooperative Governance and Traditional Affairs Portfolio Committee in the 5th Legislature (2014–2019).

In 2019 Tseki stood for election to the South African National Assembly as the 23rd candidate on the ANC's regional to national list. At the election, he won a seat in parliament. Upon election, he became a member of the Portfolio Committee on Human Settlements, Water and Sanitation.

References

External links

Mr Mohatla Alfred Tseki at Parliament of South Africa

Living people
1964 births
People from Gauteng
Members of the Gauteng Provincial Legislature
Members of the National Assembly of South Africa
African National Congress politicians
21st-century South African politicians